James Foulis (22 August 1871 – 3 March 1928), also known as James Foulis Jr., was a Scottish-American professional golfer who won the second U.S. Open in 1896. He also finished tied for third in the inaugural 1895 U.S. Open held at Newport Golf Club in Newport, Rhode Island.

Early life
Foulis was born at the "Home of Golf", St Andrews in Scotland, on 22 August 1871. His father was foreman at Old Tom Morris's golf shop and clubmaking business, and Foulis spent some time working at the shop. In 1895 he traveled to the United States to take up a job as a golf professional at Chicago Golf Club, which was the first club in the United States to have an 18-hole course. He was the first golf professional in the western States.

Golf career

1895 U.S. Open
Foulis was one of the eleven players who took part in the first U.S. Open in 1895, and he came third. The following year he won the tournament at Shinnecock Hills Golf Club on Long Island. He was representing the Chicago Golf Club and he won $200. He was helped out by the fact that twice British Open champion Willie Park, Jr., who would have been odds-on favorite if he had reached the United States in time to play, did not arrive in America until the day after the tournament. The following year the Open was played at Foulis's home club, and he finished tied for third with Willie Dunn, Jr. The most notable aspect of his game was his driving; it is said that he often drove over three hundred yards using the relatively primitive clubs of his day. He continued to compete in the U.S. Open until 1911, but did not win again.

Golf inventions
Jim Foulis and his brother David ran a golf shop at the Chicago Golf Club, and played a significant part in the evolution of golf equipment. They invented the bramble patterning for Coburn Haskell's new rubber-cored ball. In response to the demands of the new ball they developed the "mashie-niblick", the modern 7-iron, which fell between the traditional mashie (5-iron) and niblick (9-iron), and patented the design. Jim Foulis also worked as a golf course designer from 1896 until his death, designing the first golf courses in many communities across the American midwest.

Family 
Foulis had four brothers, all of whom also moved to the United States. Robert and David were also golf professionals, Simpson was a fine amateur golfer, and John was an expert ballmaker who also worked as a bookkeeper at Chicago Golf Club from 1901 to his untimely death in 1907. All five brothers are buried in Wheaton Cemetery, adjacent to Chicago Golf Club. His nephew, Jim, son of brother David, also a professional golfer, won the 1933 St. Paul Open.

Death and legacy
Foulis died on 3 March 1928. He is remembered as the winner of the 1896 U.S. Open. He finished third in the 1895 U.S. Open and was an inventor of golf equipment.

He was the original designer of the Country Club golf course in Denver, Colorado, included in Country Club Historic District, listed on the U.S. National Register of Historic Places.

Major championships

Wins (1)

Results timeline
Foulis played only in the U.S. Open.

DNP = Did not play
WD = Withdrew
"T" indicates a tie for a place
Green background for wins. Yellow background for top-10

References

External links
 
Feature Interview with Jim Healey

Scottish male golfers
American male golfers
Winners of men's major golf championships
Golfers from Chicago
Golfers from St Andrews
Scottish inventors
1871 births
1928 deaths